Barfatan (also Romanized as Barfatān and Baraftān) is a village in Estarabad Rural District, Kamalan District, Aliabad County, Golestan Province, Iran. At the 2006 census, its population was 1,837, in 479 families.

References 

Populated places in Aliabad County